Courtney Lewis (born 29 May 1984, Belfast, Northern Ireland) is a British/Irish conductor.

Biography
Lewis was a pupil at the Royal Belfast Academical Institution.  He attended the University of Cambridge, during which time he studied composition with Robin Holloway and clarinet with Dame Thea King.  He graduated from Cambridge with starred first class honours.  After completing a master's degree with a focus on the music of György Ligeti, he attended the Royal Northern College of Music, where his teachers included Sir Mark Elder and Clark Rundell.

Lewis was the co-founder and music director of Boston's Discovery Ensemble from 2008 until 2014, when the ensemble ended operations after its board declared a fundraising impasse.  Lewis made his major American orchestral debut in November 2008 with the Saint Louis Symphony Orchestra.  Lewis served as associate conductor of the Minnesota Orchestra from 2009 to 2014.  He was a Dudamel Fellow with the Los Angeles Philharmonic.  From 2014 to 2016, he was an assistant conductor with the New York Philharmonic.

In 2014, Lewis was appointed music director of the Jacksonville Symphony Orchestra (now the Jacksonville Symphony), effective with the 2015-2016 season.  In August 2020, the Jacksonville Symphony announced the most recent extension to Lewis' contract as its music director, through the 2023–2024 season.

References

External links
 Official website of Courtney Lewis
 Jeremy Eichler, 'Conductor Courtney Lewis is an artist to watch'.  Boston Globe, 1 January 2012

Video clips
Feature story on Greater Boston, WGBH TV, Boston
Feature story on StyleBoston on /WCVB TV, Boston
Profile on Boldfacers.com, 2011
Discovery Ensemble's youtube channel

 

British male conductors (music)
Irish conductors (music)
1984 births
Living people
21st-century British conductors (music)
21st-century British male musicians